Susan Lea Clifford Narvaiz is an American politician. A Republican, she is the former mayor of San Marcos, Texas.

She is the chief executive officer of Core Strategies, Inc. and a self-employed consultant.

Early life and career

Narvaiz, a native of Dayton, Ohio, was raised in San Antonio, Texas. She moved to San Marcos in 1995 to open a branch office for a national staffing company.

Narvaiz is a former chair of the Capital Area Council of Governments, as well as a chairperson for both the Capital Area Council of Government Executive Committee and the Hays-Caldwell Public Utility Agency. She also served on the board of directors for Economic Development San Marcos and the San Marcos Education Foundation and she is a member of the TTC-I35 (my35) Advisory Committee, National League of Cities Finance Administration and Intergovernmental Relations Policy Steering Committee, and the Texas Municipal League.

Narvaiz previously served on the board of directors for the Corridor Innovation Center, Enlace Coalition, Hays-Coldwell Women's Center, Mainstreet, San Marcos Area Chamber of Commerce, San Marcos Convention & Visitor Bureau, San Marcos Hispanic Chamber of Commerce, and United Way of Hays County. She served as Place 3 on the San Marcos City Council from 2002 until 2004. She was a chairperson for the Habitat for Humanity Selection Committee and Nurturing Committee, San Marcos Hispanic Chamber of Commerce, and Texas Association of Business Chambers of Commerce, as well as fundraising chair for America's Promise Youth Summit, an auction chair for Friends of the San Marcos Firefighters, a commissioner for the San Marcos Youth Commission, member of the San Marcos Rotary Club, community cadre of the San Marcos Consolidated Independent School District, Narvaiz represented Hays County for the Tri-County Human Resources & Occupational Safety Management Association.

City politics
Narvaiz was elected to San Marcos City Council Place 3 in June 2002. She was then elected as mayor of San Marcos in 2004 and was re-elected, unopposed, in 2006.

In the 2008 election, she faced Texas State University–San Marcos student Dan McCarthy and retired United States Air Force officer Dave Newman and was re-elected with 50.08% of the vote.

National politics

After departing office as Mayor of San Marcos in 2010, Narvaiz chose to run for United States Congress in the newly created 35th Congressional District. Texas's 35th congressional district was one of several controversial Texas districts drawn after the United States census in 2010. Because of its abnormal shape, caused by gerrymandering, the district was named as one of the "10 Most Contorted Congressional Districts."

In the Republican primary election, held on May 29, 2012, Narvaiz faced off against Rob Roark and John Yoggerst. Narvaiz won the primary election and avoided a runoff by obtaining 51.78% of the votes cast.

Narvaiz faced Democratic incumbent Lloyd Doggett in the general election on November 6, 2012. Narvaiz received 32.02% of total votes cast and lost the race to Doggett, who received 63.94% of the vote.

In December 2013, Narvaiz announced her intention to challenge Doggett a second time for Texas' 35th Congressional District seat.

References

External links
Susan Narvaiz at Ballotpedia
Official site

Mayors of places in Texas
Women mayors of places in Texas
Politicians from San Marcos, Texas
Living people
Texas Republicans
Year of birth missing (living people)
21st-century American women